Lascelles was a brig built at Hull, or Selby in 1812. Her master was Gascoigne. She traded as a coaster, and between Cork and Spain or England.

The French privateer Telemachus captured Lascelles, Gascoigne, master, and she arrived in Calais on 19 December 1813. When captured Lascelles had been sailing from Cork to London with 570 tierces of beef and 170 tierces of pork. Lloyd's Register for 1815 has the annotation "captured" beneath her name.

Notes, citations, and references
Notes

Citations

References
 

1812 ships
Merchant ships of the United Kingdom
Captured ships